The Blue Jacket was an 1854 medium clipper well known for the lavish decoration of the staterooms and saloon. She served in the Liverpool and Australia trades. The ship was named after the blue jackets, a traditional name for sailors in the US and British navies.

Figurehead
The figurehead was "a man from the waist up, in old sailor's costume, a blue jacket with yellow buttons, the jacket open in the front, no waistcoat, loose shirt, and a large knotted handkerchief round the neck."

Construction
Blue Jacket had a sharp bow, and a full midship section designed for stowing a large cargo. Lubbock describes this fuller style of hull, which created an appearance of "strength and power" rather than "grace and beauty," as being characteristic of ships designed by Donald McKay.

The frame of Blue Jacket was white oak, with planking and ceiling of hard pine. She was diagonally braced with iron, and square-fastened throughout.
The interior finish work was quite elegant, according to a contemporary description in the U.S. Nautical Magazine:
Her cabins, of which she has two, are under a poop deck. The saloon is 40 feet long by 14 wide, painted white, and ornamented with papier maché gilt work; in the centre of each panel is a representation of flowers, fruit and game. This saloon contains 20 state-rooms, ventilated and finished in a superior manner; the furniture, carpets, and drapery in each, being different. Each room has a square window on its side, and deck lights above. The after, or ladies' cabin, is 30 feet long by 13 wide, and contains eight state-rooms and a bath-room. This cabin is a miniature palace. It is wainscoted with mahogany, the entablatures are of rosewood, and the pillars of satinwood. The panels are ornamented with flowers, surrounded by gilt scroll work.

Voyages
The Blue Jacket was chartered by the White Star Line in 1854.

Boston to Liverpool
 12 days, 10 hours, Captain Eldridge, 1854
Liverpool to Melbourne
68/69 days, Captain Underwood, 1855
Madras to London
92 days, 1855
Lyttelton, NZ to London
63 days, Captain James White, 1863 
San Francisco to Honolulu
14 days, Capt. Dillingham, 1865–1866, to load whale oil for New Bedford

Loss of the ship
Blue Jacket left Lyttelton, New Zealand,  with a general cargo that included flax. On March 5, 1869, off the Falkland Islands, the flax caught fire. Four days later, on March 9, the ship was abandoned. On March 16, the barque Pyrmont of Hamburg rescued the crew. There were nine survivors, who managed to guard 15,000 pounds sterling of gold from the ship.

Recovery of her figurehead
After the loss of the ship, "the figurehead of the Blue Jacket was found washed up on the shore of the Rottnest Island, off Fremantle, Western Australia".

The average speed of drift for the figurehead was calculated to be 6½ miles per day.

See also 

 List of clipper ships

References

External links
Painting of the American clipper Blue Jacket, Henry Scott (British, 1911–2005)
Painting of Blue Jacket at National Maritime Museum, London
Description of Blue Jacket, from the U.S. Nautical Magazine, 1854

Clippers
Individual sailing vessels
Ships built in Boston
Age of Sail merchant ships of the United States
Victorian-era passenger ships of the United Kingdom
Troop ships of the United Kingdom
History of immigration to Australia
Coal hulks
Maritime incidents in March 1869
1854 ships